This is a list of all massacres in the Democratic Republic of the Congo.

List

References

External links 

 
 

 
Democratic Republic of the Congo
Massacres